The 2013–14 Philippine Basketball Association (PBA) Philippine Cup, also known as the 2013–14 PLDT Home DSL/myDSL-PBA Philippine Cup for sponsorship reasons, was the first conference of the 2013–14 PBA season. The tournament started on November 17, 2013, and ended on February 26, 2014. The tournament does not allow teams to hire foreign players or imports.

Format
The following format was observed for the duration of the tournament:
Two-round eliminations, with each team playing 14 games. The teams are divided into two groups on the basis of their natural draft order from the previous rookie draft. Each team will play teams within their group once, while they will play teams from the other group twice.
Group A:
Air21 Express
Alaska Aces
Barangay Ginebra San Miguel
Petron Blaze Boosters
Rain or Shine Elasto Painters
Group B:
Meralco Bolts
San Mig Super Coffee Mixers
Barako Bull Energy
GlobalPort Batang Pier
Talk 'N Text Tropang Texters
Top eight teams will advance to the quarterfinals. In case of tie, playoffs will be held only for the #2 and #8 seeds.
Quarterfinals:
QF1: #1 seed vs #8 seed (#1 seed twice-to-beat)
QF2: #2 seed vs #7 seed (#2 seed twice-to-beat)
QF3: #3 seed vs #6 seed (best-of-3 series)
QF4: #4 seed vs #5 seed (best-of-3 series)
Semifinals (best-of-7 series):
SF1: QF1 vs. QF4 winners
SF2: QF2 vs. QF3 winners
Finals (best-of-7 series)
Winners of the semifinals

Elimination round

Team standings

Schedule

Results

Eighth seed playoff

Bracket

Quarterfinals

(1) Barangay Ginebra vs. (8) Alaska

(2) Rain or Shine vs. (7) GlobalPort

(3) Petron Blaze vs. (6) Barako Bull

(4) Talk 'N Text vs. (5) San Mig Super Coffee

Semifinals

(1) Barangay Ginebra vs. (5) San Mig Super Coffee

(2) Rain or Shine vs. (3) Petron Blaze

Finals

Awards

Conference
Best Player of the Conference: June Mar Fajardo (Petron Blaze Boosters)
Finals MVP: Mark Barroca (San Mig Super Coffee Mixers)

Players of the Week

References

External links
PBA.ph
PBA-Online!

Philippine Cup
PBA Philippine Cup